The 1922 Oregon gubernatorial election took place on November 7, 1922 to elect the governor of the U.S. state of Oregon. The election matched incumbent Republican Ben W. Olcott against Democrat Walter M. Pierce. With the support of the Ku Klux Klan, then a powerful political force in the state, Pierce won the election by a wide margin.

Background and campaign
In March 1919, Oregon governor James Withycombe died in office, just two months into his second term. As prescribed by Oregon law, Oregon Secretary of State Ben Olcott succeeded Withycombe in office. In 1922, Olcott announced that he would seek a full term in office. 

In the early 1920s, the Ku Klux Klan had become a powerful political force in Oregon. Olcott refused to endorse the Klan, and shortly before the Republican primary, issued an executive proclamation against the organization for terrorist acts conducted by its members which included mock hangings. Olcott's actions nearly cost him the Republican nomination to the Klan-backed candidate, state senator Charles Hall.

With their candidate's defeat, the Klan threw their support behind Democratic candidate Walter M. Pierce, who also agreed to back the Klan's Compulsory Education Act, which would require all students to attend public, rather than private schools, a deliberate attack on Roman Catholic private schools. Both Pierce and the education initiative won wide, but short-lived victories in November: the education law was struck down by the United States Supreme Court in their 1925 Pierce v. Society of Sisters decision, and Pierce lost re-election in 1926.

Election results

References

Gubernatorial
1922
Oregon
November 1922 events